Dhok Darbal is a village of Talagang Tehsil, District Chakwal in the Punjab province of Pakistan. It lies 40 km south-west of the town of Talagang, and is 70 km from Motorway M-2 Bulkasar Interchange, and 8 km from tamman.

Nearest dhokes 
Following are the dhokes near the Dhok Darbal:

Dhoke mushab
Dhoke fateh shah
Dhoke qutab
Dhoke jat
Dhoke bhadhoor
Dhoke sahbal
Dhermond
Dhoke balawali
Dhoke mukarbi
Dhoke ardal

Nearest schools 
Government High School Dhok mushab (boys)
Government High School Dhok mushab (girls)
Government Secondary School Dhok fateh shah (girls)
Government secondary school Dhok fateh shah
Iqbal islami School dhok fateh shah (private)
Government high school Dhermond (boys, girls)

Languages
Punjabi is the native language of the majority of Dhok Darbal.

Economy
Most people of the Dhok Darbal prefer to join armed forces like Pakistan Army, Pakistan Navy and Pakistan Air Force. Dhok Darbal has the highest proportion of its population serving in the armed forces of Pakistan. 

Many people here work in agriculture.

Food 
The food which the people of Dhok Darbal consume is very modernized, including biryani and halwa.

References

Populated places in Chakwal District